Pulmonary disease, chronic obstructive, severe early-onset is a protein that in humans is encoded by the COPD gene.

References

Further reading